314 Action is a nonprofit political action committee that seeks to elect scientists in the United States.

Mission
The mission of 314 Action is to connect people with backgrounds in science, technology, engineering, and math to the skills and funding needed for a successful political campaign.

The group is characterized as a liberal and Democratic-leaning group, since 314 Action uses ActBlue as its payment processing platform and mostly targets Republican-held federal and state positions in its campaigns.

Founding
The organization was founded in 2016 by researcher Shaughnessy Naughton. Naughton is a business owner and a chemist who ran for Congress in Pennsylvania in 2014.

Name

The group gets its name from pi (π), a mathematical constant approximately equal to 3.14.

References

Sources 
 "As a Response to Trump, This Group Is Drafting Scientists to Run for Office". Motherboard. January 10, 2017. Retrieved February 23, 2017.
 Mukherjee, Sy (January 25, 2017). "Scientists Gear Up to Run for Office In a World of 'Alternate Facts'". Fortune. January 25, 2017. Retrieved February 23, 2017.
 Amy Harmon and Henry Fountain "In Age of Trump, Scientists Show Signs of a Political Pulse". New York Times. February 6, 2017.
 Ed Yong February 28, 2018 "Here's How The Scientists Running for Office Are Doing". The Atlantic. February 28, 2018.
 Maggie Astor January 13, 2019"An Ocean Engineer and a Nuclear Physicist Walk Into Congress …. ". New York Times. January 13, 2019.
 Emma Goldberg May 9, 2020 "Nightly Applause Is Nice, but Some Doctors Think Votes Would Be Nicer". New York Times. May 9, 2020.
 Joseph Marks May 20, 2019 "The Cybersecurity 202: These political candidates are running on their cybersecurity expertise". The Washington Post. May 20, 2019.

External links 
 

United States political action committees
Science advocacy organizations